Acalyptris bicornutus is a moth of the family Nepticulidae. It is found in the Florida Keys.

The length of the forewings is 1.5–1.7 mm. Adults have been collected from late September to late November.

External links

New Leaf-Mining Moths of the Family Nepticulidae from Florida

Nepticulidae
Endemic fauna of Florida
Moths of North America
Taxa named by Donald R. Davis (entomologist)
Moths described in 1978